The Nyanga bus accident occurred on 3 August 1991 and was Zimbabwe's worst traffic accident. 89 people died including the driver and 82 school children. The bus left the road while travelling to the Roman Catholic Regina Coeli School following a school sports day at the St Killian's Mission school. According to witnesses, the bus had been travelling at an excessive speed for the winding roads. Passengers and even the driver of another car had urged the driver to slow down prior to the crash.

References

1991 road incidents
Bus incidents in Zimbabwe
August 1991 events in Africa